Mehmet Xheka is a member of the Assembly of the Republic of Albania for the Democratic Party of Albania.He is a well known doctor and member of World Health Organization.He was the first and the only Deputy of the Democratic Party of the city of Berat who won the elections against the Socialist Party and Socialist Movement for Integration.

References

Living people
Democratic Party of Albania politicians
Members of the Parliament of Albania
21st-century Albanian politicians
Year of birth missing (living people)